Victor Kofi Agawu (born 28 September 1956) is a Ghanaian musicologist and music theorist. He often publishes as V. Kofi Agawu and specializes in musical semiotics and ethnomusicology. He is a Distinguished Professor at the Graduate Center, CUNY.

Education 
Victor Kofi Agawu was born on 28 September 1956 in Hohoe, the Volta Region of Ghana. Agawu attended Presbyterian Boys' Secondary School at Legon (PRESEC) where he obtained his GCE Ordinary Level Certificate and went on to do this Advanced Level at Achimota School.  He earned a bachelor's degree in music from the University of Reading in the United Kingdom in 1977, a master's degree in musical analysis from King's College London in 1978, and a Ph.D. in historical musicology from Stanford University in 1982. He is also certified by the Royal Academy of Music in the teaching of singing and by the Royal College of Music in musicianship and theory.

Career 
Agawu has taught at Princeton University, Yale University, Cornell University, King's College London, Duke University, Haverford College, and the University of Oxford. In 2006, he was appointed professor of music and African and African-American studies in Harvard University's Faculty of Arts and Sciences. He returned to Princeton several years later and then taught at the Graduate Center, CUNY as a visiting professor, returning there in January 2019 as a Professor of Music and rising to Distinguished Professor status in July 2019.  His awards include the Dent Medal in 1992, awarded by the Royal Musical Association and International Musicological Society for "outstanding contribution to musicology." Agawu has written more than 75 peer-reviewed journal articles and given over 100 keynote addresses and invited lectures.

In 2009, he was awarded the IRC Harrison Medal of the Society for Musicology in Ireland.

Publications 
Agawu's first and most widely cited book is Playing with signs: a semiotic interpretation of classical music (1991), which won the emerging scholar award from the Society for Music Theory. His next monograph was African Rhythm, A Northern Ewe Perspective (1995), which deals with the relationship and interference of the Ewe language and their music in everyday lives revealing a greater horizon for African rhythmic expression. More recent books include The African Imagination in Music (2016), Music as Discourse: Semiotic Adventures in Romantic Music (2009), and Representing African Music: Postcolonial Notes, Queries, Positions (2003).

References

Living people
Ghanaian musicologists
Ghanaian expatriates in England
Princeton University faculty
People from Volta Region
Alumni of the University of Reading
Alumni of King's College London
Stanford University alumni
Harvard University faculty
Presbyterian Boys' Senior High School alumni
Graduate Center, CUNY faculty
Music theorists
Ethnomusicologists
Corresponding Fellows of the British Academy
1956 births